"Anywhere" is a song by English drum and bass duo Sigma. It was released on 15 June 2018 by 3 Beat Records as the second single from the duo's second studio album, Hope. The song peaked at number 90 on the UK Singles Chart. The song was written by Cameron Edwards, Danny Shah, Joseph Lenzie, Sky Adams and Louis Du Sauzay.

Music video
A music video to accompany the release of "Anywhere" was first released onto YouTube on 31 August 2018 at a total length of three minutes.

Charts

Certifications

References

2018 singles
2018 songs
Sigma songs